Christmas Songs may refer to:

Christmas Songs (Bad Religion EP), 2013
 Christmas Songs (Diana Krall album), 2005
 Christmas Songs (Jars of Clay album), 2007
 Christmas Songs (Mel Tormé album), 1992
 Christmas Songs (Nora Aunor album), 1972
 Christmas Songs by Sinatra, a 1948 album by Frank Sinatra
 Christmas music, music associated with the Christmas season

See also
Christmas Song (disambiguation)